This article lists events relating to rail transport that occurred during the 1780s.

1780

Births

January births
 January 26 – John Urpeth Rastrick, English steam locomotive builder and partner in Foster, Rastrick and Company (died 1856).

October births
 October 25 – Philip Hone, first president of Delaware and Hudson Railway 1825–1826 (died 1851).

1781

Births

June births
 June 9 – George Stephenson, English steam locomotive builder.

1782

Births

Unknown date births
 Joseph Treffry (born Joseph Austen), railway promoter in Cornwall, England (died 1850).

1783

Events
 Halbeath Railway opens from the colliery at Halbeath to the harbour at Inverkeithing, Scotland.

1784

Births
December 30 – Stephen H. Long, American steam locomotive mechanical engineer who helped build the Baltimore and Ohio Railroad (died 1864).

1785

Births

Unknown date births
 Sir William Cubitt, civil engineer on the South Eastern and Great Northern Railways of England (died 1861).

1786

Births

December births
 December 22 – Timothy Hackworth, English steam locomotive builder (died 1850).

Unknown date births
 William T. James, American inventor of the link motion and spark arrester (died 1865).

1787

Events

Unknown date events
 First production of all-iron edge rail (for underground colliery use), at Plymouth Ironworks, Merthyr Tydfil, South Wales.
 First introduction of plateway (for underground use), at Sheffield Park Colliery, Yorkshire, England, by John Curr.

Births

October births
 October 18 – Robert Livingston Stevens, president of the Camden and Amboy Railroad, the first railroad built in New Jersey (died 1856).

1788

Events

Unknown date events
 First introduction of plateway for surface use, at Wingerworth Iron Foundry, Derbyshire, England, by Joseph Butler.

1789

Events

Unknown date events
 Oliver Evans is awarded a U.S. patent for his "steam carriage," a design that is believed by some historians to have influenced Richard Trevithick's work on early steam locomotives.

Births

October births
 October 8 – John Ruggles, awarded  for improved driving wheels (died 1874).

Unknown date births
 Gridley Bryant, inventor of many basic railroad technologies including track and wheels (died 1867)

See also
Years in rail transport

References

 (September 22, 2004), Timothy Hackworth. Retrieved February 9, 2005.